"Show Me Heaven" is a song written by Pär Lönn, Thomas G:son, Calle Kindbom, Susie Päivärinta and Nestor Geli, and performed by Lili & Susie at Melodifestivalen 2009. The song participated in the second semifinal held at the Skellefteå Kraft Arena on 14 February 2009, reaching the Andra chansen round, only to be eliminated in the end.

The single peaked at number 6 in the Swedish singles chart, entering on 19 April 2009.

During Melodifestivalen 2012, the song was selected for the "Tredje chansen" round.

Charts

Weekly charts

Year-end charts

References

External links 
Information at Svensk mediedatabas

English-language Swedish songs
Melodifestivalen songs of 2009
Songs written by Calle Kindbom
Songs written by Thomas G:son
Songs written by Susie Päivärinta